Lad Krabang 54 Stadium or Customs Department Stadium  หรือ  is a football stadium in Bang Phli, Samut Prakan, Thailand. It used as the home ground of Customs United F.C. and Samut Prakan F.C. The stadium has a total capacity of 2,000. The main stand has a capacity of 1,500 and the away stand has a capacity of 500. The stadium is referred as Forza stadium by the fans of both teams.

References

Buildings and structures in Samut Prakan province
Football venues in Thailand
Sport in Samut Prakan province
Sports venues completed in 2009
2009 establishments in Thailand